McAll is a surname. Notable people with the surname include:

Barney McAll (born 1966), Australian jazz musician and composer
John McAll (born 1960), Australian musician
Kate McAll, British radio director
Robert Whitaker McAll (1821–1893), English Congregationalist minister

See also
McCall